Falningsjøen is a lake in Tynset Municipality in Innlandet county, Norway. The Ya River begins at this lake. The Forollhogna National Park boundary lies at the north end of the lake.

The south end of the lake has a dam to control the water for hydro-electric power.

See also
List of lakes in Norway

References

Tynset
Lakes of Innlandet